Road Runner's Death Valley Rally (known in Japan as Looney Tunes: Road Runner vs. Wile E. Coyote and in Europe as Looney Tunes: Road Runner) is a 1992 video game developed by ICOM Simulations and published by Sunsoft for the Super Nintendo Entertainment System. It is based on the Looney Tunes characters Wile E. Coyote and the Road Runner.

Gameplay 
Road Runner's Death Valley Rally features side-scrolling platform gameplay. The player controls Road Runner, who must avoid being eaten by Wile E. Coyote. The game consists of five different environments, with each one containing three levels and a boss battle. Coyote has a unique method of ambush for every level, ranging from the Acme Batman outfit to explosives, and for every level there is a cutscene of the contraption failing once the player crosses the finish mark. After every three levels, Road Runner battles against one of Wile E. Coyote's super weapons in a boss fight.

Road Runner has a series of control movements useful to beating the game, including jumping and running. Road Runner can also peck his beak to kill enemies, and can eat bird seeds that give him a burst of turbo speed, allowing him to scale walls. However, turbo speed can only be used a limited number of times, as it depletes the bird seeds; additional turbo speed is gained by consuming more bird seeds. The boost also acts as an invincibility, being able to destroy enemies and resist damage from Coyote. The player can also make Road Runner say "meep-meep!" and make him stick out his tongue, although neither serves a gameplay function.

Reception 
Jonathan Davies of Super Play magazine gave the game a 42 percent rating and criticized it for its difficult gameplay, bad collision detection, and lack of a password feature, and wrote that the game is composed of "some absolutely fabulous animated sequences (they really are wonderful) linked by some truly appalling platform levels." Road Runner's Death Valley Rally has an aggregate score of 65.67% based on three reviews on GameRankings.

Entertainment Weekly wrote that "You, as the Road Runner, must escape the clutches of Wile E. Coyote, whose ACME-brand costumes and contraptions have been lovingly reproduced in detail from actual 1950s cartoons." Nintendo Power ranked the game 10# in their Top SNES Games of 1992 writing: "The feeling of the classic cartoon is captured through great character animations, sampled sounds and hilarious defeat scenes for Wile E. Coyote."

Cancelled sequel 
A sequel, titled Wile E's Revenge, was in development by Software Creations and was planned as a follow-up to Death Valley Ralley. Unlike the first game, the sequel would allow the user to control Wile E. Coyote as he chases the Road Runner. The game was cancelled because of Sunsoft's bankruptcy in 1995.

References

External links 
 
 Road Runner's Death Valley Rally at GameFAQs

1992 video games
ICOM Simulations games
Video games based on Looney Tunes
Platform games
Sunsoft games
Super Nintendo Entertainment System games
Super Nintendo Entertainment System-only games
Wile E. Coyote and the Road Runner
Video games about birds
Video games developed in the United States
Cartoon Network video games
Single-player video games